An  is a type of Chinese mirror in which an inscription band is the main design on the reverse side.。The name  refers to the unique design of the inscription, but they are sometimes simply called an .。Okamura Hidenori attributes the mirror to the late Pre-Han period, from the early 1st century B.C.E. to the early 1st century C.E.。They entered Japan in the mid- to late Yayoi period, mainly through northern Kyushu, and were later produced in Japan.。Not all mirrors with Chinese character inscriptions fall into this category but rather ones with  with specific characteristics are considered to be in the category.

Definition 

 defines it as "a mirror with a circular knob (a projection through which a string is threaded in the center of the mirror) as its center, divided by several spherical bands, and with inscriptions on the divided bands. The inscriptions are often in a unique character style, and are considered to be a mirror style in which the inscriptions are designed. There are three types of character styles: small seal typeface, cuneiform typeface, and gothic. There are three types of knob seating (the pattern around the knob): a bead pattern seat, a circle seat, and a four-leaf seat. The periphery is often bare with no pattern, but the width varies with age.

Research History 
In 1920, Kenzo Tomioka revealed that this type of mirror style dates back to the Predynastic period. Then in 1926,  proposed a nomenclature based on inscriptions, but he could not cope with a wide range of inscriptions and corrected the imperfection himself. A report published in 1959 by  classified the excavated mirrors of this type into three types: the Nikko mirror, the Shomei mirror, and the Lian arc pattern mirror, and identified these as the mirror type that appeared next to the nebular pattern mirror and preceded the TLV mirror.。It was Higuchi, who wrote "Kogamyo" in 1979, who established the categorization. The mirrors had previously been classified into two types, but he attempted a more detailed classification by using the common element of having variant characters as a single type of mirror.

In the 1990s,  classified the burials excavated from jar coffin tombs in northern Kyushu during the middle Yayoi period into three groups. The first group was defined as large Chinese mirrors, such as the Seibaku mirror, accompanied by bronze weapons, the second group as mainly Seibaku mirrors accompanied by iron weapons, and the third group as small inscribed banded mirrors accompanied by iron weapons, with the second and third groups being tombs dating to the late Middle Yayoi Period and the first group to an earlier period. In the 1990s, Okamura identified the third mirror type as being produced during the Han mirror period (early to mid 1st century B.C.), and stated that no other mirror types were produced during this period, but later excavations revealed a mirror with a nebula design and a mirror with a dragon design accompanying it, suggesting that other mirror types were also produced in parallel.

Okamura (1985), who says that the inscription "attracted attention because of its strict ascetic attitude," attributes it to social change, while Ishikawa Misao (1991) says that it expresses sorrow for the dead and is connected to a postmortem view of the dead.

Mirror excavation 
As of 2000, there are 786 mirrors with variant inscriptions. Of these, 56 sites and 152 mirrors were excavated in Japan.。As with other mirror types, it is possible to classify the variant inscribed band mirrors according to their face diameters. Takakura attributed this difference to the period of production, but as of 2000, it is considered to be a grading based on the surface diameter. There have been few examples of banded mirrors with inscriptions in variant characters larger than 15 cm excavated from the tombs of the kings of the Former Han Dynasty. These mirrors are not only large, but also have few omissions of inscriptions and are carefully polished. On the other hand, the 10 cm or so pieces, which make up the majority of excavated pieces, are sometimes poorly made.。

The variant Chinese inscribed banded mirror excavated here is large, as are the other accompanying Chinese mirrors, and it is assumed to have been acquired specially. More than 20 inscribed mirrors were excavated at  D, and 10 inscribed mirrors were excavated at the Tateiwa Ruins

By the first half of the Late Yayoi Period, the Ariake Sea coastal areas spread widely to Nagasaki, Oita, Chugoku region, and Shikoku. These mirrors are characterized by the absence of large mirrors and the absence of accompanying mirror styles, such as the rectangular-shaped rectangular mirrors that followed. In the late Yayoi period, small Japanese mirrors made in the Yayoi period that imitated Yayoi inscribed banded mirrors began to be produced mainly at the Suku Okamoto site.。

Based on the above aspects, Nishikawa speculates that the influx of variant inscribed banded mirrors from China correlates with the emergence of social disparities such as base settlements, very large buildings, and huge tombs that began to appear around the middle Yayoi period, and that a reorganization of social structure took place around the same time.。

See Also 

 Flower Mirror
 Large Flower Mirror
 Mirrors in Shinto

References

Bibliography 

 書籍

 
 
 

 論文など

See Also 

 
Yayoi period
Han dynasty
Archaeology of China
Bronze mirrors
Pages with unreviewed translations